The surname Newton is a toponymic surname, derived from the common place name "New-town".  "As nearly every county has its ... Newton," there are many independent families that share this surname.

The Newton family motto is 'Faveat fortuna', meaning 'May fortune favour'.

The most well-known bearer of the name was Isaac Newton, and he is usually the one meant when a reference is made to "Newton" without qualification. The surname may also refer to:

People

A

 A. Edward Newton (1864–1940), American industrialist, author and book collector
 Alan Newton (disambiguation)
 Albert Newton (disambiguation)
 Alfred Newton (1829–1907), British zoologist and ornithologist
 Algernon Newton (1880–1968), British artist
 Amanda Newton (illustrator) (c. 1860–1943), American botanical illustrator
 Amanda Newton (netball) (born 1977), English former netball player
 Arthur Newton (cricketer) (1862–1952), English cricketer

B
 Basil Newton (1889–1965), British ambassador
 Becki Newton (born 1978), American actress
 Ben Newton (disambiguation)
 Benjamin Wills Newton (1807–1899), English theologian, early leader of the Plymouth Brethren
 Bert Newton (1938–2021), Australian television personality
 Bill Newton (disambiguation)

C
 Cam Newton (born 1989), American football player
 Cam Newton (ice hockey) (born 1950), National Hockey League goaltender
 Cam Newton (safety) (born 1982), American former football player
 Cecil Newton (born 1986), American football player and brother of Cam
 Charles Newton (disambiguation)
 Christopher Newton (disambiguation)
 Clara Chipman Newton (1846–1936), an American china painter
 Conor Newton (born 1991), English football player

D
 David Newton (disambiguation)

E
 Edward Newton (disambiguation)
 Edwin Tulley Newton (1840–1930), British palaeontologist 
 Emanuel Newton (born 1984), American mixed martial artist
 Ernie Newton (disambiguation)

F
 Frances Newton (disambiguation)
 Frank Newton (disambiguation)
 Fred Newton (disambiguation), also includes Frederic and Frederick Newton

G
 Gilbert Stuart Newton (1795–1835), British artist
 George Newton (disambiguation)

H
 Hal Newton (1933–2014), Canadian football player
 Harold Newton (1904–1963), American painter
 Sir Harry Newton, 2nd Baronet (1875–1951), British politician
 Harry Newton (cricketer) (1935–2014), English cricketer
 Helmut Newton (1920–2004), German photographer
 Henry Newton (disambiguation)
 Hibbert Alan Stephen Newton (1887–1949), known as Alan Newton (surgeon), Australian surgeon
 Hubert Anson Newton (1830–1896), English astronomer
 Huey P. Newton (1942–1989), founder of Black Panther Party

I
 Ian Newton (born 1940), English ornithologist
 Irene Newton (1915–1992), English artist
 Isaac Newton (1642–1727), English physicist, mathematician, alchemist, and philosopher 
 Isaac Newton (agriculturalist) (1800–1867), American agriculturalist

J
 Jack Newton (disambiguation)
 Jake Newton (footballer) (born 1984), Guyanese footballer 
 Jake Newton (ice hockey) (born 1988), American ice hockey player
 James Newton (disambiguation)
 John Newton (disambiguation)
 Joseph Newton (disambiguation), includes Joe and Joey Newton
 Judith Juice Newton (born 1952), American singer

K
 Keith Newton (prelate) (born 1952), English prelate of the Roman Catholic Church
 Keith Newton (footballer) (1941–1998), English international footballer
 Kathryn Newton (born 1997), American actress

L
 Lauren Newton (singer) (born 1952), European musician
 Lee Newton (born 1985), American YouTube personality

M
 Margaret Newton (1887–1971), Canadian plant pathologist and mycologist 
 Margit Evelyn Newton (born 1962), Italian actress
 Mark Newton (politician) (born 1960), American politician
 Mark Charan Newton (born 1981), British fantasy author
 Mark J. Newton, convicted child sexual abuser
 Martha Elizabeth Newton (1941–2020), British bryologist and botanist
 Matt Newton (born 1977), American actor 
 Matthew Newton (born 1977), Australian actor
 Matty Newton (born 1984), Australian songwriter, bass player, guitarist, keyboardist, and producer
 Maxwell Newton (1929–1990), Australian media publisher
 Michael Newton (disambiguation)
 Mike Newton (disambiguation)
 Milt Newton (born 1965), American former basketball player
 Morgan Newton (born 1991), American former football player

N
 Nate Newton (born 1961), former NFL offensive lineman
 Nell Jessup Newton, American lawyer and professor

O
 Olivia Newton-John (born 1948), English-Australian singer, songwriter, actress, entrepreneur, and activist
 Ollie Newton (born 1988), New Zealand cricketer
 Omari Newton, Canadian actor

P
 Pania Newton, New Zealand lawyer and activist
 Patti Newton (born 1945), Bert Newton's wife
 Paul Newton (disambiguation)
 Paula Newton (born 1968), Canadian anchor and correspondent for CNN
 Peter Newton (kayaker) (born 1970), American sprint kayaker
 Peter Newton (winemaker) (1926–2008), English-born American winemaker

R
 Richard Newton (disambiguation)
 Robert Newton (disambiguation)
 Ross Newton

S
 Samuel B. Newton (1868–1932), American college football coach
 Samuel Newton (sport shooter) (1881–1944), Canadian sport shooter
 Sarah Newton (born 1961), British politician
 Sean Newton (born 1988), English footballer
 Stephen Newton (1853–1916), English cricketer
 Stephen Newton (artist) (born 1948), British artist
 Stephen Hibbert Newton (born 1955), Australian teacher
 Steve Newton (born 1941), American basketball coach
 Sydney Newton (1875–1960), English photographer
 Syvelle Newton (born 1985), American college football player

T
 Thandiwe Newton (born 1972), English actress
 Theodore Newton (actor) (1904–1963), American actor
 Thomas Newton (disambiguation)
 Todd Newton (born 1970), American game show host
 Tony Newton (disambiguation)
 Tyler Newton (born 1982), American basketball player

V
 Virgil Miller Newton (born 1938), Antiochian Orthodox priest and former head of controversial teen drug-rehabilitation facilities

W
 Wayne Newton (born 1942), American singer and entertainer
 Wes Newton (born 1977), English darts player
 Williams Newton (1893–1970), American college sports coach
 William Ellis Newton (born 1919), Australian Victoria Cross recipient

See also 
 Newton baronets
 Newton (disambiguation)

References

English-language surnames
English toponymic surnames